Letná Stadion is a football stadium in Zlín, Czech Republic. It is currently used as the home ground of FC Trinity Zlín and has an all-seated capacity of 6,375. It is located near the Dřevnice river.

External links 
 Stadium information
 Photo gallery and data at Erlebnis-stadion.de

Football venues in the Czech Republic
Czech First League venues
FC Fastav Zlín
Buildings and structures in Zlín
1953 establishments in Czechoslovakia
Sports venues completed in 1953
20th-century architecture in the Czech Republic